What Happened to Monday (known in several territories as Seven Sisters) is a 2017 dystopian science-fiction action thriller film directed by Tommy Wirkola and written by Max Botkin and Kerry Williamson. The film stars Noomi Rapace, Glenn Close and Willem Dafoe.

What Happened to Monday was released theatrically in Europe and Asia, with Netflix distributing the film in the United States, United Kingdom, and Latin America on August 18, 2017. The film received mixed reviews from critics.

Plot

Around 2043, overpopulation has caused a worldwide crisis, resulting in a strict one-child policy enforced by the Child Allocation Bureau. All but the eldest children are put into cryosleep. Electronic bracelets track all citizens.

Karen Settman dies while giving birth to identical septuplets. Their grandfather and Karen's father, Terrence, names them after the days of the week and trains them to pose as a single individual named after their mother, leaving the house only on the day of their name. Terrence ensures that they share information daily and replicate any physical accidents that alter their appearance. The sisters use wigs and makeup to cover up any identifying features. After a young Thursday sneaks out of the apartment and injures herself skateboarding, Terrence amputates part of the index finger of each sister to mimic Thursday’s injury.

In 2073, Monday prepares her disguise, nervous about giving a presentation. At a checkpoint, Monday runs into Adrian Knowles, a C.A.B. agent who talks to her. At the bank, Monday's co-worker, Jerry, a competitor for a promotion, hints at blackmailing her.

When Monday fails to return home, Tuesday retraces her steps. Tuesday learns that Monday got the promotion and met Jerry at a bar. Before she can investigate further, C.A.B. agents detain her and cut off her communications. In the C.A.B. facility, Adrian sees Tuesday escorted to a cell, where she meets Nicolette Cayman, head of the Bureau and a candidate for Parliament. Cayman says she knows about Tuesday's siblings and, when Tuesday offers a bribe, Cayman reveals that Monday had offered her the same deal. Cayman orders C.A.B. agents to assassinate Tuesday's sisters.

C.A.B. agents use an enucleated eye to bypass a retinal scanner at the Settman home. The sisters kill the agents, but Sunday is killed. Learning the eye is Tuesday's, the sisters suspect Jerry may have sold them out. The next day, Wednesday leaves without disguising herself and confronts Jerry. He reveals that "Karen" got the promotion when she sent millions of euros to Cayman to fund her campaign. After a C.A.B. sniper kills Jerry, Wednesday flees his apartment.

The others remotely guide Wednesday to safety but are interrupted when Adrian shows up at the sisters' apartment, concerned about "Karen.” Surmising that Adrian has a relationship with one of them, Thursday convinces Saturday to leave with him. Saturday, a virgin, talks with Adrian at his apartment. She covertly links their bracelets while sleeping with him, allowing Friday to hack into the C.A.B. On a video feed, the sisters believe they have found Monday in a holding cell. Meanwhile, C.A.B. agents corner and kill Wednesday. After Adrian leaves his apartment, C.A.B. agents arrive and kill Saturday after she tells her siblings Monday was dating Adrian. The sisters' apartment is raided simultaneously by a C.A.B. squad led by Joe, the head of security of C.A.B. Admitting that she cannot survive on her own, Friday sacrifices herself by blowing up their apartment to allow Thursday to escape and rescue Monday.

Adrian hears about the incident and rushes back to the Settman apartment. Thursday confronts him in his car, blaming him for her sisters' deaths. Adrian now realizes "Karen" is an assumed identity for several siblings and claims to love Monday, whom he agrees to help rescue. Adrian sneaks Thursday, concealed in a body bag, into C.A.B. headquarters. She secretly records a child undergoing cryosleep. Instead of being frozen, the child is incinerated. Adrian and Thursday discover Tuesday, missing an eye, inside the cell. They search for Monday, only to discover that she has sold them out to Cayman.

At Cayman's campaign fundraiser, Thursday and Monday fight in a women's restroom, with Thursday accidentally shooting Monday. Meanwhile, Tuesday and Adrian broadcast Thursday's video footage of the child's incineration, leaving everyone at the event shocked. The now-traumatized crowd directs its attention on Cayman, who angrily confronts Thursday before her bodyguards pull her off. Monday comes out of the restroom brandishing a gun. Joe shoots Monday, thinking that she intends to kill Cayman, and Adrian kills Joe.

As the crowd flees, Monday reveals to Thursday that she is pregnant and asks her to not let the C.A.B. take her unborn twins. Thursday realizes Monday sacrificed her sisters in much the same way their grandfather cut off their fingers, in order to protect her children. Monday dies from her wounds. The Child Allocation Act is abolished, and Cayman faces the death penalty for her actions, which she continues to insist were necessary. Thursday, Adrian, and Tuesday (with a new artificial eye) watch Monday's and Adrian's twins develop in an artificial womb. Tuesday declares Terry to be her new name, while Thursday declares hers to be Karen (henceforth becoming the "real" Karen Settman). As the camera dollies out, hundreds of babies are seen and heard crying in one enormous ward, as nursing staff care for them.

Cast
 Noomi Rapace as the Settman siblings (Monday, Tuesday, Wednesday, Thursday, Friday, Saturday, and Sunday), septuplets sharing the identity of "Karen Settman."
 Willem Dafoe as Terrence Settman, the siblings' grandfather.
 Glenn Close as Nicolette Cayman, the head of the Child Allocation Bureau (C.A.B.).
 Marwan Kenzari as Adrian Knowles, a C.A.B. security guard and love interest of Monday Settman.
 Pål Sverre Hagen as Jerry, Karen's coworker. 
 Tomiwa Edun as Eddie, the septuplets' doorman. 
 Robert Wagner as Charles Benning

Production 
The film was originally written for a man, but director Tommy Wirkola had always wanted to work with Noomi Rapace. He pitched the idea of having a female as the main protagonist to producer Raffaella De Laurentiis who agreed to the idea. Wirkola was inspired by films such as Children of Men and Blade Runner due to their realism and world building. The film was shot in Romania over 94 days with a budget of $20 million.

Release
What Happened to Monday premiered at the 2017 Locarno Festival. The streaming rights for the film were purchased by Netflix.

Reception
Rotten Tomatoes, a review aggregator, reports that 59% of 37 surveyed critics gave the film a positive review, with an average rating of 5.8/10. Its critics' consensus says: "This high-concept sci-fi action thriller will make you stress-eat all the popcorn while Noomi Rapace (times seven) goes on a murderous spree to find out What Happened to Monday, but it may still leave you hungry in the end." According to Metacritic, which calculated a weighted average score of 47 out of 100 based on 12 critics, the film received "mixed or average reviews".

Jessica Kiang of Variety called it a "ludicrous, violent, amusingly dumb sci-fi actioner". Kiang said that, although it is full of plot holes and Rapace's characters are thinly characterized, it is likely to become a cult film.

See also
 Dayworld

References

External links
 What Happened to Monday on Netflix
 
 

2017 films
2017 science fiction action films
2010s science fiction thriller films
American science fiction action films
American science fiction thriller films
Belgian action films
Belgian science fiction thriller films
British science fiction action films
British science fiction thriller films
French science fiction action films
French science fiction thriller films
English-language French films
English-language Belgian films
American dystopian films
Films set in the 2070s
Films set in apartment buildings
Films shot in Romania
Films shot in Bucharest
Overpopulation fiction
Films directed by Tommy Wirkola
Films set in 2073
2010s English-language films
2010s American films
2010s British films
2010s French films